Asbury United Methodist Church, originally Highland Park Methodist Episcopal Church, is a historic church on Bailey Avenue in Chattanooga, Tennessee.

The congregation was organized in 1889 as the Highland Park Methodist Episcopal Church. The congregation soon moved into a new frame church that it used for about 20 years before completing the current building. The current church building is a brick structure in a Gothic design created by architect Reuben Harrison Hunt. It was completed in 1909, dedicated in 1911, and added to the National Register of Historic Places in 1980.

Highland Park Methodist Episcopal Church changed its name to Asbury Methodist Church in 1938, when the Methodist Episcopal Church and Methodist Episcopal Church, South, merged. It later added "United" to its name when the United Methodist Church was formed. Another local congregation with a similar name, Highland Park Methodist Episcopal Church, South, became St. Andrew's Methodist Church and later St. Andrew's United Methodist Church. Asbury United Methodist Church closed on July 1, 1984. Its congregation merged with Brainerd United Methodist Church and the church property was sold to Highland Park Baptist Church, which renamed the former Asbury Methodist building as the "Asbury Chapel". St. Andrew's closed in 2004. When Highland Park Baptist Church relocated to Harrison, Tennessee, in 2013, it sold Asbury Chapel and six other buildings in the Highland Park neighborhood to Redemption Point Church, a Church of God congregation based in Ooltewah.

References

1889 establishments in Tennessee
1984 disestablishments in Tennessee
United Methodist churches in Tennessee
Churches on the National Register of Historic Places in Tennessee
Churches completed in 1909
20th-century Methodist church buildings in the United States
Churches in Chattanooga, Tennessee
Southern Methodist churches in the United States
National Register of Historic Places in Chattanooga, Tennessee